Sylvie Guillaume (born 11 June 1962) is a French politician and Member of the European Parliament (MEP) from France. She is a member of the Socialist Party, part of the Party of European Socialists.

Local political career 

After a career in the social economy, Guillaume joined the Socialist Party (PS) in 1988 in the Rhône. She has held various responsibilities in the French Socialist Party, including President of the Socialist National Council between 2000 and 2003. In 1998, she was elected a regional councillor in the Rhône-Alpes Regional Council and reelected in 2004. In 2001, she was elected deputy mayor of Lyon and was reelected in 2008.

Member of the European Parliament, 2009–present 
In the 2009 European elections, Guillaume was the second candidate on the PS list in the South-East region, and was elected to the European Parliament. She was reelected at the same position in 2014.

Guillaume has been serving on the Committee on Civil Liberties, Justice and Home Affairs (LIBE) since 2009, where she is in charge of human rights. On LIBE, she was appointed in 2009 rapporteur for the directive on common procedures for granting and withdrawing international protection. She is also a substitute member of the Committee on Women's Rights and Gender Equality (FEMM) and the Committee on Constitutional Affairs (AFCO). After being a women's rights activist, she was appointed National Secretary of the Socialist Party for Gender Equality.

In addition to her committee assignments, Guillaume is a member of the Spinelli Group, the European Parliament Intergroup on Artificial Intelligence and Digital, the European Parliament Intergroup on LGBT Rights, the European Parliament Intergroup on Disability, the European Parliament Intergroup on Integrity (Transparency, Anti-Corruption and Organized Crime) and the MEP Alliance for Mental Health.

Between January 2012 and 2014, Guillaume served as Vice President of the Progressive Alliance of Socialists and Democrats parliamentary group in charge of Citizens' Europe, along with Véronique De Keyser, Enrique Guerrero Salom, Stephen Hughes, Rovana Plumb, Bernhard Rapkay, Libor Rouček, Patrizia Toia and Marita Ulvskog.

In 2012 Guillaume was responsible for immigration issues in the presidential campaign of François Hollande.

From 2014 until 2019, Guillaume served as one of the Vice Presidents of the European Parliament, under the leadership of President Antonio Tajani. In this capacity, she was in charge of the parliament's transparency register and served as Vice Chairwoman of the Working Group on Information and Communication Policy.

In 2020, Guillaume joined Mounir Satouri, Frédérique Dumas and Hubert Julien-Laferrière in visiting several refugee camps in northern Syria that hold individuals displaced from the Islamic State of Iraq and the Levant, including al-Hawl and Roj. 

Ahead of the 2022 presidential elections, Guillaume publicly declared her support for Anne Hidalgo as the Socialists’ candidate and joined her campaign team as diplomatic adviser.

External links 
 Website of Sylvie Guillaume

References 

1962 births
Living people
People from Antony, Hauts-de-Seine
Politicians from Île-de-France
Socialist Party (France) MEPs
MEPs for South-East France 2014–2019
MEPs for France 2019–2024
21st-century women MEPs for France
French socialist feminists